Boheyr or Behor or Bohair or Boher or Buher may refer to:
 Boheyr 1, Ahvaz County
 Boheyr 2, Ahvaz County
 Boheyr-e Olya, Bavi County
 Boheyr-e Sofla, Bavi County